Norman Macleod (born circa 1967) is a STV North news presenter and journalist for the Northern Scotland edition of STV News at Six.

A Gaelic-speaker from Scalpay, Harris on the Outer Hebrides, Macleod worked part-time at two BBC local radio stations, one in Stornoway and the other in Aberdeen, whilst at college. Upon completing his studies, he joined Grampian Television (now STV North) as a bilingual trainee in 1987 and later joined the North Tonight team as a reporter and newsreader. Following a major revamp of the nightly news programme in 2006, he became the programme's chief solo anchor, a duty he shares with Andrea Brymer.

Macleod has previously presented and produced some of STV's Gaelic-language programming and the station's online video blog Northern Exposure.

References

External links

Living people
People educated at Oldmachar Academy
Scottish television presenters
STV News newsreaders and journalists
1960s births